Mehtarlu (also Romanized as Mehtarlū; also known asMehdī Yārī, Mekhtiāri, and Mekhtyari) is a village in Ozomdel-e Jonubi Rural District, in the Central District of Varzaqan County, East Azerbaijan Province, Iran. At the 2006 census, its population was 881, in 186 families.

References 

Towns and villages in Varzaqan County